The Greatest Hits is the first greatest hits album by American hip hop group Salt-N-Pepa. It was released on October 7, 1991, by FFRR Records and Next Plateau Entertainment. The album was certified Platinum in the United Kingdom.

Track listing
 Push It - 3:30 from Hot, Cool & Vicious
 Expression  (Brixton Bass Edit)	- 3:31 from Rapped in Remixes: The Greatest Hits Remixed
 Independent (Independent Funk Vocal) - 4:48 from Blacks' Magic
 Shake Your Thang (It's Your Thing) - 3:59 from A Salt with a Deadly Pepa
 Twist and Shout - 3:48 from A Salt with a Deadly Pepa
 Let's Talk About Sex - 3:30 from Blacks' Magic
 I Like It Like That - 4:07 from A Salt with a Deadly Pepa
 Tramp - 3:20 from Hot, Cool & Vicious
 Do You Want Me (Remix) - 3:18 from Blacks' Magic
 My Mic Sounds Nice - 4:11 from Hot, Cool & Vicious
 I'll Take Your Man - 5:06 from Hot, Cool & Vicious
 I Gotcha - 3:53 from A Salt with a Deadly Pepa
 I Am Down - 4:13 B-side to "Push It" Single
 You Showed Me  (The Born Again Mix)  - 3:23

Personnel
 Producer: Hurby Luv Bug (tracks: 1, 5 to 13) & The Invincibles (tracks: 4 to 6, 7, 9, 12)

Charts

Weekly charts

Year-end charts

Certifications

References

1991 greatest hits albums
FFRR Records albums
Next Plateau Entertainment albums
Salt-N-Pepa albums